Aoora is a South Korean singer, and composer. He made his debut on 4 September 2009 with his popular song “Love Back”. His solo debut came on March 28, 2014, with the digital single “Body Part. His recent mashup ‘Swag Se Swagat’ has received a million views. He also recently released the song ‘Cham Cham’.

Career

References 

South Korean male singers
DJs
K-pop concerts by artist
Year of birth missing (living people)
Living people